Reduced level in surveying refers to equating elevations of survey points with reference to a common assumed datum. It is a vertical distance between survey point and adopted datum plane. Thus, it is considered as the base elevation which is used as reference to reckon heights or depths of other important places. Reduced here means equating and level means elevations. Datum may be a real or imaginary location with a nominated elevation of straight zero.

Datum used
The most common and convenient datum which is internationally accepted is mean sea level. Countries take their nearby sea levels as datum planes for calculations of reduced levels. For example, Pakistan takes sea near Karachi as its datum while India takes sea near Mumbai as its datum for calculation of reduced levels. The term reduced level is denoted shortly by ‘RL’. National survey departments of each country determine RL’s of significantly important locations or points. These points are called permanent benchmarks and this survey process is known as Great Trigonometrical Surveying (GTS). The permanent benchmarks act as reference points for determining RL’s of other locations in a particular country.

Instruments
The instruments used to determine reduced level include:
 Optical levelling instruments like automatic level, Y level, dumpy level, or Coke’s reversible level

 Levelling staff
 Tripod stand

RL calculation
RL of a survey point can be determined by two methods:
 Height of instrument method
 Rise and fall method

Significance
 For drainage of water under gravity a suitable slope is required. Thus, roads are built in the fashion that their RL’s on sides are comparatively smaller than the RL at the mid-span of the road. This ensures proper drainage of water from roads.
 For construction of buildings, roads, and dams, a horizontal levelled surface is required. So, at construction sites, RLs of different points are obtained. The ground surface is then being levelled to the RL, which is obtained by taking the arithmetic mean of RLs of different points.

References

Surveying
Civil engineering